Ryan Layne (born 25 December 1982) is a Barbadian cricketer. He played in three first-class matches for the Barbados cricket team from 2005 to 2011.

See also
 List of Barbadian representative cricketers

References

External links
 

1982 births
Living people
Barbadian cricketers
Barbados cricketers